The Hits of the World is a collection of weekly record charts published by Billboard magazine. It ranks the top 25 songs in more than 40 countries around the globe based on streaming and digital sales. These charts in 40+ countries joined existing chart listings for Billboard-branded licensees in Argentina, Italy, Japan, South Korea and Vietnam, along with Billboards longstanding third-party partner charts like Official Charts Company in the United Kingdom.

Announced on February 14, 2022, and launched the following day, the tracking period for each chart runs from Friday to Thursday of every week with new charts released every Tuesday.

Methodology 
The chart tracks songs' performance from Friday to Thursday and is made available on Tuesday morning. Each chart includes 25 songs, ranked based on streaming data and digital sales provided by MRC Data, in a unique blend for each territory.

Charts

Pre-existing charts 
 Billboard Canadian Albums
 Billboard Canadian Hot 100
 Billboard Argentina Hot 100
 Billboard Japan Hot 100
 Billboard Italia Hot 100
 Billboard K-pop 100
 Billboard Top Thai Songs (launched on March 17, 2023)
 Billboard Top Thai Country Songs (launched on March 17, 2023)
 Billboard Vietnam Hot 100
 Billboard Vietnam Top Vietnamese Songs
 The Official U.K. Albums Chart
 The Official U.K. Songs Chart
 Australia Albums
 Germany Albums
 Greece Albums

Africa 
 South Africa Songs

Asia Pacific 
 Australia Songs
 Hong Kong Songs
 India Songs
 Indonesia Songs
 Malaysia Songs
 New Zealand Songs
 Philippines Songs
 Singapore Songs
 South Korea Songs (added on May 7, 2022 as a replacement of the K-pop Hot 100)
 Taiwan Songs
 Thailand Songs (removed as of the issue dated February 26, 2022)
 Turkey Songs

Europe 
 Austria Songs
 Belgium Songs
 Croatia Songs
 Czech Republic Songs
 Denmark Songs
 Finland Songs
 France Songs
 Germany Songs
 Greece Songs
 Hungary Songs
 Iceland Songs
 Ireland Songs
 Luxembourg Songs
 Netherlands Songs
 Norway Songs
 Poland Songs
 Portugal Songs
 Romania Songs
 Russia Songs (removed as of the issue dated April 9, 2022)
 Slovakia Songs
 Spain Songs
 Sweden Songs
 Switzerland Songs
 U.K. Songs

Latin America 
 Bolivia Songs
 Brazil Songs
 Chile Songs
 Colombia Songs
 Ecuador Songs
 Mexico Songs
 Peru Songs

Notes

References

External links 
Billboard charts

Billboard charts